Carlos Oliveira is a Christian exorcist and a deliverance minister. He was born again in July 1989, after accepting Jesus Christ as his personal savior. He is the founder of one of the largest deliverance ministries in North America. He was born in Brazil and has been living in the U.S. since 1997. Oliveira's focus is on the subject of curses, witchcraft, cursed sites and cursed objects, and on the negative effects they have on people and the world. He is a reality TV personality, author, Christian motivational speaker, and singer. 

Published works
 Manual For Miracles, Healing & Deliverance: Freedom From Demons, Diseases, Curses & Witchcraft (2015)
 Curse Breaking and House Cleansing Manual: Breaking Generational, Financial and Cultural Curses. Removing Witchcraft, Voodoo, Occultism, Cursed ... To Spiritual House Cleansing and Blessing (2015)
 Do-It-Yourself Spiritual House Cleansing & Blessing: Practical Guide To Spiritual House Cleansing & Blessing The Bible Way! (2015)
 Singleness Curse Breaking Prayer: An Intensive Curse Breaking Prayer Designed To Set People Free From Curses and Demons (2015)
 God's Bank VS. Satan's Bank: Financial Curse Breaking For Individuals and Business Owners (2015)
 Premarital And Singleness Curse Breaking: For Engaged Couples, Singles Planning To Get Married And Married Couples! (2015)

Controversy
Oliveira has encountered criticism by religious skeptics, and Catholic bishops and priests, for his approach to deliverance ministry and exorcism; mainly because Oliveira claims he can perform an exorcism during a phone call with a client. Oliveira does not follow the Catholic dogma, or the Catholic exorcism procedures which would normally include prayer recitals (ex. "Hail Mary," and the "Athanasian Creed") along with prayers to saints.

In response, Archbishop Isaac Kramer said, "When you perform an exorcism, it involves several prayers. It involves commanding the demons. It involves holy water. It involves other things… that you just cannot do through a computer screen."

Throughout Oliveira's ministry, he has run campaigns such as: "Consuming Fire Campaign,", "Mobile Prayer Unit" and "Adopt Your City".

Filmography
 Nathan For You, in Mechanic; Realtor Miracles Decoded, in A French Faith Healer Battling Demons in LA & Indian Fire-Eaters Taboo in Odd Jobs''

References

American Christian writers
American male singers
American exorcists
Writers from California
Brazilian emigrants to the United States